The former Catholic diocese of Mirepoix, in south-west France, was created in 1317 by Pope John XXII from the diocese of Pamiers. It existed until the French Revolution, and was suffragan of the Archbishop of Toulouse. Its see was Mirepoix, Ariège.

Among its bishops were:

 Raymond Atton d'Auterive 1318–1325
 Jacques Fournier 1326–1327, later Pope Benedict XII
 Pierre de Piret 1327–1348
 Jean I. de Cojordan 1348–1361
 Arnaud de Villars 1361–1363 oder 1362–1362
 Pierre-Raymond de Barrière 1363–1368 or 1377
 Jean II. 1368 to ca. 1375
 Jean de Proins 1376–1377
 Guillaume de Provines 9. July to 29. September 1377
 Arnaud de La Trémoille 1377 or ca. 1380–1394
 Bertrand de Maumont 1394–1405
 Guillaume du Puy 1405–1431 or 1433
 Guillaume d'Estouteville 1431–1433 or 1440–1441
 Jourdain d'Aure 1433–1441 or 1440
 Eustache de Lévis-Léran 1441–1462 or 1463
 Louis d'Albret 1462–1463 
 Jean de Lévis-Léran 1463–1467
 Scipion Damián 1467–1469
 Élie Rivals 1470–1478
 Gabriel du Mas 1478–1486
 Jean d'Espinay 1486–1493
Vacant 1493–1497
 Philippe de Lévis-Léran 1497–1537
 David Beaton de Balfour 1537–1546 
 Claude de La Guiche 1546–1553
 Innocenzo Ciocchi del Monte 1553–1555 
 Jean Reuman Suavius (Jean Suau) 1555–1560 
 Pierre de Villars I. 1561–1576
 Pierre de Villars II. 1576–1587
 Pierre Bonsom de Donnaud 1587–1630
 Louis de Nogaret d’Espernon 1630–1655
 Louis-Hercule de Lévis de Ventadour 1655–1679
 Pierre de La Broue 1679–1720
 François-Honoré Casaubon de Maniban 1721–1729 (danach Erzbischof von Bordeaux)
 Jean-François Boyer 1730–1736, preceptor to the Dauphin, father of Louis XVI (1730-1736)
 Quiqueran de Beaujeu 1736–1737
 Jean-Baptiste de Champflour 1737–1768
 François Tristán de Chambón 1768–1790

See also
Catholic Church in France
List of Catholic dioceses in France

References

Bibliography

Reference works
  (Use with caution; obsolete)
  (in Latin) 
 (in Latin)

Studies

External links
 Source

Acknowledgment

 
Mirepoix
1317 establishments in Europe
1310s establishments in France
Religious organizations established in the 1310s
Dioceses established in the 14th century